Goddamnit is the debut album by the Chicago-based rock band Alkaline Trio, released October 13, 1998 through Asian Man Records.

Artwork and title
The album cover has 3 red alarm clocks, each set at 6:00, representing 666. "I used to set my alarm clock when I was a bike messenger to 6 o'clock in the morning, and when the alarm clock would go off, the first word out of my mouth was always 'Goddamnit!'", says Matt Skiba.

Reception 

As of 2008, Goddamnit has sold 94,000 copies in the United States, according to Nielsen SoundScan. Mike DaRonco of AllMusic called Goddamnit "hands down the perfect listening in the wake of a broken heart" and remarked that "It's rare that a band such as Alkaline Trio can make love songs appealing without being labeled as 'wimpy' or 'generic', and Goddamnit is the record to erase those labels."

Track listing

Personnel
Matt Skiba – guitar, lead and backing vocals
Dan Andriano – bass guitar, backing and lead vocals
Glenn Porter – drums
Rob Doran – bass guitar (on Redux version bonus tracks)

References

External links

Goddamnit at YouTube (streamed copy where licensed)

1998 debut albums
Alkaline Trio albums
Asian Man Records albums
Albums produced by Matt Allison (record producer)